Ferdinand "Fred" Helmuth Imhoff (born 15 February 1942 in The Hague) is a sailor from the Netherlands, who represented his country at the 1972 Summer Olympics in Kiel, Germany as helmsman in the Flying Dutchman Brave Henderik IV (H-230). With crew Simon Korver they took the 10th place. Imhoff was the substitute for the Dragon during the 1968 Olympics.

During the 1970s Imhoff led the Dutch Yellow Joker Sailing Team, a group of sailors who sailed many Dutch National Classes, like the Solo as well as Flying Dutchman and Yngling. Later Imhoff specialized in keelboat classes in general and belonged to the world top in the Dragon between 1986 and 2006. Imhoff nowadays sails the 2.4 Metre.

Controversy
During the selection for the Dutch Olympic Sailing Team for the 1976 Olympics a controversy emerged between twelve sailors and the selection committee chaired by André du Pon. This discussion focussed on the role of Frieda Vollebergt who did the communication for the sailing team. As mother of Erik Vollebregt, Sjoerd Vollebregt and Peter Vollebregt – All three candidates for the 1976 Olympic sailing event – she was accused for having a bias towards het children in the communication. In the end Fred Imhoff and Heike Blok lost the lawsuit and were removed from the 1976 selection.

Professional life
Imhoff owned an specialized enterprise in sailing equipment. And was one of the first overseas dealers for Harken fittings. Also Imhoff developed the brand 'Imhoff' for sailing clothes. Furthermore, he developed during the 1970s and 1980s: Spars (Imhoff) and Sails (Gaastra Imhoff Goldlabel Sails).

Books
Fred Imhoff published (some of them in cooperation with Lex Pranger) several books on sailing that were translated in many languages. Some of the Dutch titles are:
 Dit is snel zeilen (1975) 
 Dit is getrained zeilen (1978) 
 Winnen is geen geluk (2014)

Sources

External links
 

Living people
1942 births
Sportspeople from The Hague
Dutch male sailors (sport)
2.4 Metre class sailors
Solo class sailors
Yngling class sailors
Star class sailors
Dragon class sailors
Sailors at the 1972 Summer Olympics – Flying Dutchman
Olympic sailors of the Netherlands